René Burkhalter of Switzerland was a member of the Central Committee and the Technical Commission of the Swiss Federation of Fencing. He was Founder and President during 25 years of the "Grand Prix de Bern" and president of the Swiss Olympic Association from 1997 to 2001.

In 2001 he was awarded the Olympic Order by the IOC.

References

Swiss referees and umpires
Recipients of the Olympic Order
Year of birth missing (living people)
Living people